In neuroanatomy, corticomesencephalic tract is a descending nerve tract that originates in the frontal eye field (Brodmann area 8) and terminate in the midbrain. Its fibers mediate conjugate eye movement.

Structure 
The corticomesencephalic tract originates from the frontal eye field in the caudal part of the middle frontal gyrus and the inferior frontal gyrus (Brodmann's area 8). It runs rostral to the pyramidal tract in the posterior limb of the internal capsule. Then, it courses posteriorly toward the nuclei of the oculomotor nerve (III), trochlear nerve (IV) and abducens nerve (VI), the three cranial nerves that mediate eye movements. At the level of the caudal midbrain, corticomesencephalic fibers descend through the tegmentum in the medial lemniscus toward the oculomotor (III) and the trochlear (IV) nuclei on the contralateral (opposite) side.  However, the fibers to the abducens (VI) nucleus do not terminate directly onto the nucleus. Instead, they terminate onto the paramedian pontine reticular formation (PPRF). The PPRF contains excitatory “burst” neurons that transmit the pulse to the ipsilateral (the same side of the body) abducens nucleus.

Function 
The fibers of the corticomesencephalic tracts are involved in the control of the conjugate eye movement. The fibers to the oculomotor (III) nucleus control the medial rectus, superior rectus, inferior rectus, and inferior oblique muscles. Fibers to the trochlear (IV) nucleus control the superior oblique muscle. Fibers to the paramedian pontine reticular formation (PPRF) project to the abducens (VI) nucleus, which controls the movement of the lateral rectus muscle. Also, fibers to the paramedian pontine reticular formation mediates the movements with the oculomotor (III) and trochlear (IV) nerves through the medial longitudinal fasciculus (MLF). The MLF coordinates the interaction between the oculomotor (III) and the abducens (VI) nuclei, which create bilateral conjugate horizontal eye movements.

Additional images

See also 
 Frontal eye field
 Cranial nerves
 Pyramidal tracts

References 

Central nervous system pathways